Select Model Management was Established in London in 1977, by founders Tandy Anderson and sisters Clare and Chrissie Castagnetti, Select Model Management is a global network of model and talent agencies.

Company
In their early days, Select was one of the first modelling agencies to find models by "scouting" them on the street. They adopted that method of recruitment to quickly establish a client list and reputation. In the 1980s, competitor agencies also used the technique to grow their businesses.

For two seasons (in 2005 and 2006), Anderson served as a judge on Make Me a Supermodel after which the winning competitors received a modelling contract with Select. In 2011, the agency launched a mobile app to be used by prospective models.

In 2019, Select Model Management announced a global expansion through an integration with MP Management.

Select has offices in 8 countries across the world; London, Milano, Paris, Stockholm, Atlanta, Chicago, Los Angeles and Miami.

Select Model Management is part of the Silva International Investments portfolio owned by Riccardo Silva.

Models

Select Model Management represents the likes of David Gandy, Irina Shayk, Jon Kortajarena, Oliver Cheshire, Camille Kostek, Lucan Gillespie, Will Chalker, Marjan Jonkman, Shanelle Nyasiase, Aliet, and Amanda Murphy. 

Models and talent currently represented include:

 Adam Senn
 Anna Selezneva
 Barbara Fialho
 Brad Kroenig
 Lewis Helim
 Bregje Heinen
 Camilla Rutherford
 Camille Kostek
 Daphne Groeneveld
 David Gandy
 Devon Aoki
 Eliza Cummings
 Ellen Golding
 Fei Fei Sun
 Frederikke Sofie
 Frida Aasen
 Gracie Carvalho
 Heather Marks
 Heloise Guerin
 Ieva Lagūna
 Irina Shayk
 Jessica Hart
 Jon Kortajarena
 Josh Cuthbert
 Kirsten Owen
 Lais Ribeiro
 Lilah Parsons
 Maryna Linchuk
 Mickey Hardt
 Mila Miletic
 Natasha Poly
 Nicole Neumann
 Noah Mills
 Oliver Cheshire
 Oliver Stummvoll
 Patrick Kafka
 Paul Sculfor
 Pixie Geldof
 Primrose Archer
 Rianne ten Haken
 Sam Webb
 Sofia Richie
 Tasha Tilberg
 Teddy Quinlivan
 Thom Morell
 Tony Ward
 Will Chalker
 Xenia Tchoumitcheva

See also
 List of modeling agencies

References

Bibliography
 Boyd, Marie Anderson: Model: The Complete Guide for Men and Women - Foreword by Clare Castagnetti. London: Collins & Boyd, 1997.  .

External links
Official Website
Select Model Management in the Fashion Model Directory
Models.com: Top-ranked Models - Select Model Management
Models.com: Models - Select Model Management

Modeling agencies
Companies based in the City of Westminster